Double X was an artist collective active from 1975 to 1985. Their aim was to expand the visibility of art made by women.
Exhibitions held by Double X displayed work by their members and other established/emerging women artists. One can find many perspectives which are now considered to be the foundation of the feminist art movement within Double X's founding statement.

“We are committed to expanding the notion of what is considered art . . . .We recognize a pluralistic art that is both stylistically diverse and expressive of a variety of points of view in a framework such that although different modes may conflict with one another, they do not negate one another.”

However Double X has been left out of many history books while their legacy is 'incontournable'.
Double X comprised members such as: Faith Wilding,  Audrey Chan, Barbara McCullough, Micol Hebron, Nancy Youdelman, Merion Estes, Connie Jenkins, Carol Kaufman, Rachel Rosenthal, Nancy Buchanan, Jan Lester Martin, Nancy Webber, Marsia Alexander-Clarke, Vanalyne Green, Diane Calder,  Mayde Herberg, Judith Simonian, Rachel Youdelman, Vaughan Rachel.

References

Wilding, Faith. By Our Own Hands: The Women Artist's Movement in Southern California, 1971-76.

External links
XX REDUX– revisiting a feminist art collective

Feminist art organizations in the United States
American artist groups and collectives
Arts organizations established in 1975
Organizations disestablished in 1985
Arts organizations disestablished in the 20th century
1975 establishments in the United States
1985 disestablishments in the United States